The BDO International Grand Prix Series was a series of tournaments in the sport of darts. Organised by the British Darts Organisation (BDO), the series was made up of five already established 'stand-alone' darts tournaments that were played under a generic ‘umbrella’ format. The five darts tournaments were; the BDO British Classic, the BDO British Open, the BDO Gold Cup, the BDO International Open and the BDO Welsh Open. The BDO awarded points in the men's singles at each event from the quarter-final to final stages. After all five tournaments were completed, the person who accumulated the most points over the five tournaments would be declared the overall winner and winner of the BDO International Grand Prix Series.

History 
The BDO International Grand Prix Series was established in 2008. The five darts tournaments that made up the Series were; the BDO British Open, the BDO British Classic, the BDO Gold Cup, the BDO International Open and the BDO Welsh Open. Each tournament was a ‘stand-alone’ event, but was played under a generic ‘umbrella’ International Grand Prix title. The BDO awarded points at the each event in the men's singles events from the quarter final to final stages. After the five tournaments were completed, the person who accumulated the most points over the five tournaments would be declared the overall winner and the winner of BDO International Grand Prix Series winner. The five tournaments were broadcast live on Setanta Sports, which marked a debut for the sport of darts on the channel. In each tournament, the final stages of the men’s singles from the quarter finals to the final stages were broadcast live on Setanta Sports. For sponsorship purposes, it was known as the BDO Fire Kills International Grand Prix Series.

Event information

Tournament dates 
Tournaments dates in 2008 and 2009 and were played in the following order;

Points scoring 
The points scoring system was the same in 2008 and 2009.

Prize money 
The prize money was £32,000 in 2008, but dropped to £28,000 in 2009.

Results

2008 

2008 BDO International Grand Prix Series Final Standings

2009 

2009 BDO International Grand Prix Series Final Standings

References

External links 
BDO International Grand Prix Series Roll of Honour Darts Database.
BDO Welsh Open Roll of Honour Darts Database.
BDO International Open Roll of Honour Darts Database.
BDO Gold Cup Roll of Honour Darts Database.
BDO British Classic Roll of Honour Darts Database.
BDO British Open Roll of Honour Darts Database.
BIGPS 2008 - BDO British Open Red Dragon Darts.
BIGPS 2008 - BDO International Open Red Dragon Darts.

2008 establishments in the United Kingdom
2009 disestablishments in the United Kingdom
British Darts Organisation tournaments